Brooks Howard Lennon (born September 22, 1997) is an American professional soccer player who plays as a winger and right-back for Major League Soccer club Atlanta United.

Club career
As a teenager, Lennon played with the Real Salt Lake youth academy in Arizona. He signed with English team Liverpool in 2015, and joined their youth teams.

On December 20, 2017, it was announced that Lennon would join Real Salt Lake on a permanent basis. During the 2018 season, he made an appearance at rightback in an early defeat, eventually establishing himself as the club's starter at the position.

On December 2, 2019, Atlanta United acquired Lennon from Real Salt Lake in exchange for $150,000 in General Allocation Money and $150,000 in Targeted Allocation Money.

International career
Lennon won the 2017 CONCACAF U-20 Championship with the United States.

On January 8, 2018, Lennon received a call-up for the United States men's national soccer team for a friendly against Bosnia and Herzegovina. Lennon also holds an Irish passport making him eligible to represent the Republic of Ireland.

On January 21, 2022, Lennon was called into his first World Cup Qualifying camp with the U.S. Men's Senior team.

Career statistics

Club

International

Honors 
United States U20
 CONCACAF U-20 Championship: 2017

Individual
 CONCACAF U-20 Championship Best XI: 2017

References

1997 births
Living people
People from Paradise Valley, Arizona
Sportspeople from the Phoenix metropolitan area
Soccer players from Arizona
Association football forwards
American soccer players
Liverpool F.C. players
Real Salt Lake players
Atlanta United FC players
Homegrown Players (MLS)
Major League Soccer players
American expatriate soccer players
American expatriate sportspeople in England
Expatriate footballers in England
United States men's youth international soccer players
United States men's under-20 international soccer players
United States men's international soccer players
Association football fullbacks